This is a list of notable LGBT people from the city and metropolitan area of Chicago, Illinois.

Activists 

 Jane Addams – settlement activist, social reformer, Nobel Peace Prize laureate, and co-founder of Chicago's Hull House
 Gaylon Alcaraz – community organizer, activist, and former executive director of the Chicago Abortion Fund
 Lorrainne Sade Baskerville – social worker, activist, and founder of transgender social service agency TransGenesis
 Charlene Carruthers – activist and physical education teacher who director of Black Youth Project 100 and board member of SisterSong
 Shannon Downey – activist and crafter known for her work as a cross-stitcher in craftivism
 Henry Gerber – activist who founded the Society for Human Rights, the first LGBT rights organization in the country
 Vernita Gray – married her wife in Illinois's first same-sex marriage, helped organize Chicago's first pride parade, and helped found Lavender Woman, the city's first lesbian newspaper 
 Peg Grey – activist, physical education teacher, and athlete who served as the first woman co-chair of the Federation of Gay Games
 Miss Major Griffin-Gracy – LGBT rights activist and former executive director at the Transgender Gender Variant Intersex Justice Project who was present at the pivotal Stonewall riots in 1969
 Jean Hardisty – activist who founded Political Research Associates and Chicago's first battered women's shelter
 Mary Morten – activist, documentary filmmaker, and author
 Pidgeon Pagonis – advocate for intersex people, documentary filmmaker, and youth leadership coordinator at Advocates for Informed Choice
 Craig Rodwell – gay rights activist known for founding the Oscar Wilde Memorial Bookshop in Greenwich Village, New York
 Ellen Gates Starr – settlement activist, social reformer, and co-founder of Chicago's Hull House with Jane Addams
 Phill Wilson – advocate for people of color with AIDS and former executive director of the Black AIDS Institute

Aviation and military
 Allen R. Schindler Jr. – U.S. Navy radioman who was murdered by two of his shipmates for being gay
 Amanda Simpson – Airbus Americas vice president, former deputy assistant Secretary of Defense, and the first openly transgender federal political appointee in the United States 
 Karen Ulane – transsexual pilot whose firing led to an ultimately unsuccessful 1983 lawsuit against Eastern Airlines under the Civil Rights Act of 1964

Arts and entertainment

Actors 

 Alexandra Billings – actor, teacher, and LGBT advocate known for playing Davina on Transparent
 Leyna Bloom – actor, dancer, and model who was the first openly transgender woman of color to appear in Vogue India
 Pat Bond – actor and performer known for appearing in the documentary Word Is Out (1978)
 Megan Cavanagh – played Marla Hooch in A League of Their Own and voiced Judy Neutron in several Jimmy Neutron movies and TV shows
 Parvesh Cheena – actor known for roles in Outsourced and Crazy Ex-Girlfriend
 Peter Coffield – actor known for his performance in the film Cry Rape
 Barry Dennen – actor, voice actor, and singer known for playing Pontius Pilate in Jesus Christ Superstar
 Cameron Esposito – actor in and co-creator of the sitcom Take My Wife, stand-up comedian, and host of the podcast Queery
 John Franklin – actor who appeared in The Addams Family (1991)
 Kathleen Freeman – character actor known for her work with Jerry Lewis, The Blues Brothers, and Naked Gun : The Final Insult
 Garcia – actor and production assistant known for portraying Jake Rodriguez in Tales of the City
 Alexandra Grey – played roles on Empire, Transparent, and MacGyver
 Sean Hayes – actor, comedian, and producer known for his role as Jack McFarland on the sitcom Will & Grace
 Rock Hudson – prominent actor of the 1950s and 60s who portrayed leading roles in movies such as All That Heaven Allows, Magnificent Obsession, and Pillow Talk
 Pepi Lederer – actor, writer, niece of Marion Davies, and daughter of Reine Davies
 Jane Lynch – actor, comedian, and author best known for playing Sue Sylvester on Glee
 Lauren Patten – actor, singer, and writer who originated the character Jo in the musical Jagged Little Pill
 David Pevsner – actor, singer, dancer, and playwright
 Anthony Rapp – actor, writer, director, and photographer known for playing Mark Cohen as part of the original cast of Rent
 Robert Reed – actor best known for portraying Mike Brady in The Brady Bunch

 Brendan Scannell – actor and comedian known for his roles in Bonding and Heathers
 Jussie Smollett – actor and singer known for playing Jamal Lyon on Empire and for allegedly staging a hate crime against himself
 Theo Germaine – actor known for playing James on Netflix's The Politician
 Nico Tortorella – actor and former model known for Scream 4, The Following, and Younger

Adult entertainment 

 Mia Isabella – transgender porn star
 Scott Masters – gay pornography producer and director who founded Nova Studios
 Dom Orejudos – leather artist, dancer, and choreographer who founded Kris Studios with Chuck Renslow
 Chuck Renslow – gay erotica publisher, businessman, and activist who founded one of the first leather bars in the world with Dom Orejudos

Comedians 

 Matt Bellassai – comedian, writer, and internet content creator
 Whitney Chitwood – stand-up comedian known for her comedy album The Bakery Case
 Matteo Lane – comedian and singer who starred in MTV's Guy Code and Joking Off
 Paula Pell – comedy writer, producer, and actor best known for her work on Saturday Night Live
 Irene Tu – stand-up comedian, actor, and producer
 Danitra Vance – comedian, actor, and repertory player on Saturday Night Live'''s eleventh season, the first black woman to hold such a role
 Jaboukie Young-White – stand-up comedian, television writer, and correspondent for The Daily Show Culinary arts 
 Art Smith – celebrity chef and founder of Common Threads, a children's charity

 Dance 
 Gerald Arpino – choreographer, artistic director, and dancer who co-founded the Joffrey Ballet with his romantic partner Robert Joffrey
 Brian Friedman – creative director, choreographer, and dancer known for appearing as a judge on So You Think You Can Dance? and for choreographing celebrities' music videos
 Loie Fuller – dancer, actor, and author known for creating the serpentine dance and for her innovations in theatrical lighting
 Craig Hall – ballet dancer, former soloist with the New York City Ballet, and faculty member at the School of American Ballet

 Drag 

 Sister Boom Boom – drag nun and astrologer
 Kim Chi – drag queen, artist, and cosmetics entrepreneur known for appearing on season 8 of RuPaul's Drag Race Shea Couleé – drag queen, model, and podcast host who appeared on season 9 of RuPaul's Drag Race Denali – drag entertainer and ice skater who appeared on season 13 of RuPaul's Drag Race Miss Foozie – drag performer
 Silky Nutmeg Ganache – drag queen who appeared on season 11 of RuPaul's Drag Race Gigi Goode – drag queen known for appearing on season 12 of RuPaul's Drag Race Gia Gunn – drag performer and competitor on season 6 of RuPaul's Drag Race Monica Beverly Hillz – drag queen and transgender advocate known for appearing on season 5 of RuPaul's Drag Race Tony Midnite – female impersonator, costume designer, and activist
 The Vixen – drag queen and co-founder of the Black Girl Magic drag show known for appearing on season 10 of RuPaul's Drag Race Film 

 Allan Carr – film and theater producer and talent manager
 Bill Damaschke – film producer who served as chief creative officer of DreamWorks Animation and president of animation and family entertainment at Skydance Media
 Angela Robinson – director, producer, and screenwriter known for D.E.B.S. Rose Troche – director, producer, writer, and actor who created the film Go Fish, which gave visibility to various aspects of lesbian culture
 The Wachowskis – filmmaker sisters known for The Matrix trilogy
 Aerlyn Weissman – Canadian documentary filmmaker and sound technician known for Forbidden Love: The Unashamed Stories of Lesbian Lives Yvonne Welbon – filmmaker and founder of the nonprofit Sisters in Cinema
 Tanya Wexler – filmmaker behind Hysteria Internet personalities 

 Brittany Ashley – actor and stand-up comedian known for her work with BuzzFeed
 Antoine Dodson – internet celebrity, singer, and entrepreneur known for being featured in "Bed Intruder Song"
 Dylan Geick – social media personality, writer, and wrestler

 Music 

 Jeffery Austin – musician known for appearing on season 9 of The Voice Patricia Barber – jazz pianist and singer-songwriter
 Keith Barrow – singer-songwriter, entertainer, and son of civil rights activist Willie Barrow
 Taylor Bennett – hip-hop artist and brother of Chance the Rapper
 Terry Blade – singer-songwriter and lyricist
 Big Dipper – rapper and podcast host
 Da Brat – rapper and actor behind Funkdafied, the first rap album by a female artist to go platinum
 Honey Dijon – D.J. and fashion plate
 K.Flay – singer, songwriter, producer, and rapper known for her debut album Life as a Dog Ezra Furman – singer-songwriter and former front person for Ezra Furman and the Harpoons
 Marla Glen – Germany-based singer, actor, songwriter, and leader of the Marla Glen Band who is known for her album This Is Marla Glen Laura Jane Grace – punk rock musician, transgender advocate, and author best known for leading the band Against Me!
 Steve Grand – singer-songwriter and model known for his homoerotic country song "All-American Boy"
 Tony Jackson – pianist, singer, and composer known for his song "Pretty Baby"
 Juba Kalamka – musician, hip-hop artist, and co-founder of Deep Dickollective
 Frankie Knuckles – music producer, remixer, and D.J. known as the "Godfather of House" for his contributions to the genre
 Adam Mardel – musician, songwriter, and member of the band Second Alibi
 Octo Octa – house producer and D.J.
 Chuck Panozzo – rock musician and bassist known for founding the band Styx
 Alan Pierson – conductor and artistic director
 Doug Pinnick – bassist and singer for King's X and KXM
 Martin Sorrondeguy – punk musician, documentary filmmaker, and photographer who founded the bands Los Crudos and Limp Wrist
 Lila Star – hip-hop artist, actor, and pageant competitor who is the self-proclaimed "first Latina trans rapper"
 Justin Tranter – songwriter, musician, and activist who has written music for the likes of Lady Gaga, Selena Gomez, and Justin Bieber
 Jim Verraros – singer and actor famous for appearing on the first season of American Idol Photography 
 Richard Renaldi – portrait photographer and Guggenheim fellow
 Edmund Teske – photographer
 Tom Bianchi – photographer, artist, and former attorney who specializes in male nude photography

 Reality television 

 Milan Christopher – rapper, actor, and model known for appearing on season 2 of Love & Hip Hop: Hollywood Andy Herren – public speaking professor known for winning season 15 of Big Brother George Kotsiopoulos – fashion plate and editor of C magazine who was a panelist on the television show Fashion Police Law Roach – stylist with celebrity clientele best known for appearing as a judge on Legendary Television 

 Paris Barclay – television director, producer, and former president of the Directors Guild of America, the first black and openly gay person to hold that role
 Christopher Cantwell – television producer, director, and writer who co-created the show Halt and Catch Fire Robert Greenblatt – former chairman of NBC Entertainment, former chairman of WarnerMedia Entertainment, and the first openly gay broadcast television president
 Brittani Nichols – producer, actor, comedian, and writer known for her film Suicide Kale Joey Soloway – director, writer, producer, and filmmaker known for their work with the television show Transparent Burr Tillstrom – puppeteer and creator of the popular Kukla, Fran, and Ollie television show
 Lena Waithe – television writer, actor, and producer known for her role on Master of None Randall Winston – television producer known for Scrubs and Spin CityTheater
 Claudia Allen – playwright and screenwriter known for her lesbian-themed work, including Hannah Free Kevin Bellie – former artistic director of Circle Theatre Chicago
 Sharon Bridgforth – playwright, author, activist, and founder of the root wy'mn theatre company 
 David Cerda – playwright and producer who founded Hell in a Handbag Productions
 David Cromer – theater director and actor
 Frank Galati – stage director, professor, playwright, and actor
 E. Patrick Johnson – performance studies professor, actor, and author
 Alvina Krause – Northwestern University professor and theatrical director
 Mark Lamos – stage director, administrator, actor, and writer
 Scott McPherson – playwright and actor
 Tanya Saracho – actor and writer for television and the stage, known for co-founding Teatro Luna, Chicago's first all-Latina theatrical troupe

 Visual arts 

 Tom Bachtell – illustrator and caricaturist known for his work with The New Yorker Roger Brown – artist and leader in the Chicago Imagist movement
 Edie Fake – alternative comic book author, painter, illustrator, and artist
 Emil Ferris – cartoonist, writer, and artist known for My Favorite Thing Is Monsters Harmony Hammond – artist, curator, scholar, and co-founder of A.I.R. Gallery
 Greer Lankton – artist known for her work in the medium of dolls
 Betty G. Miller – artist, deaf advocate, and professor known as the Mother of Deaf View/Image Art
 John Schacht – artist who explored a variety of styles at the edge of Chicago's art scene
 Rupert Kinnard – cartoonist who created the first openly gay African American comic book characters
 Sean – cartoonist and activist known for his illustrated gay erotica

 Business 

 Fred Eychaner – chairman of Newsweb Corporation and philanthropist who supports many LGBT causes in Chicago
 Robert Gottschalk – businessman, camera inventor, and founder of Panavision
 Dema Harshbarger – businesswoman and talent manager
 Jennifer Pritzker – member of the prominent Pritzker family, CEO of TAWANI Enterprises, retired U.S. army colonel, and the world's first transgender billionaire

 Education 
 John D'Emilio – professor, LGBT historian, writer, and activist
 J. Michael Durnil – president of the Simon Youth Foundation, former senior vice president of the Gay and Lesbian Alliance Against Defamation, and former administrator at Roosevelt University
 Jeannette Howard Foster – librarian, professor, researcher, and pioneer in the study of lesbian literature
 Sarah Hoagland – professor and author
 Tonda L. Hughes – researcher and professor known for contributing to the field of LGBT women's healthcare
 Marie J. Kuda – historian, writer, and publisher of Chicago LGBT culture
 Charles R. Middleton – historian, educator, and the president of Roosevelt University, making him the first openly gay major university president in the country
 Althea Warren – librarian who headed the San Diego Public Library, the Los Angeles Public Library, the California Library Association, and the American Library Association

 Felons 
 Nicole Abusharif – Villa Park resident convicted of murdering Rebecca Klein, her same-sex domestic partner
 John Wayne Gacy – serial killer and sex offender who sometimes made appearances as "Pogo the Clown" prior to his apprehension, conviction, and execution
 Michelle Kosilek – convicted murderer who unsuccessfully and repeatedly sued the Commonwealth of Massachusetts for sex reassignment surgery

 Philanthropy and nonprofits 

 Robert Allerton – philanthropist and son of stockyard magnate Samuel W. Allerton who patronized the Art Institute of Chicago and the Honolulu Academy of the Arts and whose name is borne by green spaces in Hawaii and Illinois.
 David Bohnett – philanthropist and founder of GeoCities who has funded many programs for the advancement of LGBT people
 Marty Mann – public health pioneer, founder of the National Council on Alcoholism, and one of the first women to embrace Alcoholics Anonymous
 Laura Ricketts – board member of Lambda Legal and co-owner of the Chicago Cubs
 Mary Rozet Smith – philanthropist and companion of Jane Addams who helped fund Chicago's Hull House

 Politics and law 

 Kelvin Atkinson – former Nevada state Assemblyman, state Senator, and state Senate majority leader who resigned amid a campaign finance scandal that ultimately led to his conviction and imprisonment.
 James Cappleman – politician serving as alderman for Chicago's 46th ward
 Kelly Cassidy – politician and activist who represents the 14th district in the Illinois House of Representatives
 Thomas R. Chiola – former Cook County Circuit Court judge and the first openly gay elected official in Illinois
 Phillipe Cunningham – Minneapolis city councillor among the first openly transgender men to be elected to office in the United States
 Jay Paul Deratany – lawyer, LGBT advocate, filmmaker, and playwright
 Maria Hadden – politician and activist serving as alderman for Chicago's 49th ward, the first openly gay black woman to serve on the city council
 Renee C. Hanover – attorney and LGBT rights activist, believed to be the first openly lesbian lawyer in the United States
 Greg Harris – member of the Illinois House of Representatives and the state's first openly gay House majority leader
 Pearl M. Hart – attorney, activist, professor, and political candidate who focused on defending the rights of children, women, immigrants, and LGBT people

 Patricia Ireland – attorney, activist, and former president of the National Organization for Women
 Lotta Hetler James – civic worker, candidate for governor of California, and community member active in child welfare, women's clubs, and education in Hanford, California
 Andrea Jenkins – politician, performance artist, poet, activist, and former political aide who was elected to the Minneapolis City Council in 2017, making her the first openly transgender black woman to be elected to public office in the United States
 William B. Kelley – lawyer and gay activist
 Jim Kolbe – former United States Representative and second openly gay Republican member of Congress
 Lori Lightfoot – politician and attorney currently serving as the 56th Mayor of Chicago, the first black lesbian person to hold that office
 Raymond Lopez – politician serving as alderman for Chicago's 15th ward
 Larry McKeon – member of the Illinois House of Representatives and gay activist who was the state's first openly gay legislator
 Carlos Ramirez-Rosa – politician and Chicago's first openly gay Latino alderman
 Judith Rice – politician and Cook County Circuit Court judge who previously served as the City Treasurer of Chicago
 Mary M. Rowland – federal judge for the Northern District of Illinois
 Tom Tunney – politician and restaurateur who is the vice mayor of Chicago and an alderman on the Chicago City Council
 Mary Yu – justice on the Washington Supreme Court, the first Asian-American, Latina, and openly gay person to serve on the panel

 Religion 
 Robert Carter – Jesuit priest and gay rights activist
 Clarence H. Cobbs – head of the spiritualist First Church of Deliverance, Bronzeville community leader, and radio broadcaster

 Science and technology  

 Robert Cabaj – psychiatrist, scholar, and author who served as president of the Association of LGBTQ Psychiatrists and the Gay and Lesbian Medical Association
 E. Kitch Childs – clinical psychologist and LGBT rights activist
 Coraline Ada Ehmke – software developer, open source advocate, and writer
 Arlene Halko – medical physicist and gay rights advocate
 Gretchen Kalonji – materials scientist, professor, and academic administrator
 Jessica Mink – astronomer, software developer, and data archivist who works at the Smithsonian Astrophysical Observatory
 Carlos T. Mock – physician, writer, and advocate
 Adrienne J. Smith – psychologist and LGBT rights advocate
 Carl G. Streed – physician, medical professor, researcher, and LGBT advocate

 Sports 

 Jason Brown – figure skater who was the 2015 U.S. national champion
 Terry Donahue – professional baseball player who played for the Peoria Redwings
 Robert Dover – equestrian and the first openly gay Olympic athlete
 Fallon Fox – retired mixed martial arts fighter, the first known transgender person to compete in the sport
 Regina George – Nigerian sprinter and Olympic athlete
 Timothy Goebel – former Olympic figure skater and the first person to perform a four-revolution jump in competition
 Hurley Haywood – former race car driver, author, and driving instructor
 Billie Jean King – former professional tennis player and LGBT rights advocate
 David Kopay – former NFL football player who was one of the first professional athletes to come out as gay
 Chris Mosier – triathlete and transgender rights activist
 Judy Sowinski – roller derby skater and coach

 Writers 

 Margaret C. Anderson – founder and editor of the literary magazine The Little Review, author, and partner of Jane Heap
 Rane Arroyo – poet, playwright, and creative writing professor at the University of Toledo
 Allen Barnett – author and co-founder of GLAAD who wrote The Body and Its Dangers, a collection of short stories on gay life and the AIDS epidemic
 Jay Bell – writer and author of the Something Like... series
 Barrie Jean Borich – writer known for authoring My Lesbian Husband Alice Hastings Bradley – science fiction author who wrote under the pseudonym James Tiptree Jr.
 Marlon Brando – Oscar-winning actor who appeared in The Godfather and A Streetcar Named Desire Mike Connolly – columnist for The Hollywood Reporter Jon-Henri Damski – writer, columnist, and advocate who documented and reported on LGBT culture in Chicago
 St. Sukie de la Croix – author, columnist, and playwright
 Patrick Dennis – author known for writing Auntie Mame: An Irreverent Escapade Henry Blake Fuller – author and short story writer whose controversial Bertram Cope's Year was the first mainstream novel to include a gay relationship
 Judith Palache Gregory – writer, permaculturalist, and educator who served as editor of The Catholic Worker David M. Halperin – professor, author, and co-founder of GLQ who wrote One Hundred Years of Homosexuality and Before Pastoral Lorraine Hansberry – writer and playwright who penned A Raisin in the Sun, the first Broadway production written by a black woman
 Jane Heap – editor of The Little Review, writer, artist, and partner of Margaret C. Anderson
 Samantha Irby – comedian, blogger, and author of We Are Never Meeting In Real Life and Wow, No Thank You. Christina Kahrl – sports journalist and LGBT advocate who co-founded Baseball Prospectus
 Daniel M. Lavery – writer, author, and co-founder of The Toast Parker Molloy – author and transgender advocate
 Willard Motley – author and journalist most famous for writing Knock on Any Door Ifti Nasim – poet, radio host, and activist whose homosexuality-themed poetry was the first of its kind in the Urdu language
 Achy Obejas – author, poet, journalist, and translator
 Suze Orman – financial advisor and author known for her CNBC show and television appearances
 Andrew Patner – journalist, interviewer, and critic active in print, broadcast, and electronic media
 Torrey Peters – writer, author of Detransition, Baby, and one of the first trans women to be published by a "Big Five" publisher
 Riley Redgate – young adult author of Seven Ways We Lie and Final Draft Frank M. Robinson – science fiction writer and friend of Harvey Milk's known for authoring The Dark Beyond the Stars and The Glass Inferno Robert Rodi – novelist, comedian, critic, and comic book writer
 Dan Savage – writer and activist known for his sex advice column Savage Love and for creating the It Gets Better Project
 James Schuyler – poet who won a Pulitzer Prize for his 1980 collection The Morning of the Poem Randy Shilts – journalist and author whose book And the Band Played On garnered acclaim for documenting the AIDS epidemic
 Valerie Taylor – writer and activist popular for penning lesbian fiction
 Edmund White – novelist, biographer, professor, and critic best known for writing A Boy's Own Story Mary Wings – comic book author and illustrator known for Come Out Comix'', the first lesbian underground comic

See also

 Chicago LGBT Hall of Fame

References

Chicago-related lists
LGBT culture in Chicago
Lists of people from Illinois
Lists of American LGBT people